The men's omnium competition at the 2023 UEC European Track Championships was held on 11 February 2023.

Results

Scratch race

Tempo race

Elimination race

Points race

References

Men's omnium
European Track Championships – Men's omnium